Victoria Burge (born 1976) is an American artist known for her work in printmaking. Her work is included in the collections of the Smithsonian American Art Museum, the British Museum and the Metropolitan Museum of Art, New York.

References

Living people
1976 births
Artists from New York City
20th-century American women artists
21st-century American women artists
American women printmakers